Coprococcus (ATCC 27759) is a genus of anaerobic cocci which are all part of the human faecal flora, but rarely seen in human clinical specimens. "Coprococcus includes those gram-positive, anaerobic cocci that actively ferment carbohydrates, producing butyric and acetic acids with formic or propionic and/or lactic acids. Fermentable carbohydrates are either required or are highly stimulatory for growth and continued subculture." - Lillian V. Holdeman & W. E. C. Moore. The genus is bio-chemically closely related to Ruminococcus, and phylogenetically to the genus Lachnospira.

Coprococcus eutactus is an obligately anaerobic, nonmotile, gram-positive coccus occurring in pairs or chains of pairs. Cells may lose colour readily and acquire a slightly elongate shape in a medium containing a fermentable carbohydrate, but are normally round, and 0.7 to 1.3 µm in diameter.

Coprococcus may be used as a microbial biomarker to assess the health of the human gastro-intestinal tract. Gut microorganisms maintain gastro-intestinal health and the mounting evidence of gastro-intestinal problems in autistic children makes a link between autism and intestinal microbiota highly probable, but the paucity of data on intestinal microflora means a definite link has not yet been demonstrated. Early studies overlooked potentially beneficial gut flora missing in autistic children.

Coprococcus, specifically Coprococcus eutactus, may impact on the desire to exercise by augmenting dopamine activity during physical activity.

Coprococcus species
C. catus Holdeman & Moore
C. comes Holdeman & Moore

Etymology
'kopros' - excrement, faeces; 'kokkos' - berry; 'Coprococcus' - faecal coccus 
'eutaktos' - orderly, well-disciplined (referring to the uniform reactions of the different strains)

References

Gut flora bacteria
Lachnospiraceae
Bacteria described in 1974